Vic Feldman on Vibes, subtitled Champagne Music for Cats Who Don't Drink and also reissued as Mallets A Fore Thought, is an album by vibraphonist Victor Feldman recorded in 1957 and originally released on the Mode label.

Reception

The Allmusic review by Scott Yanow called it an "enjoyable and relaxed bop date". On All About Jazz Samuel Chell observed: "Feldman's versatility may have worked against him, as it caused the limited jazz public to view him as a 'miscellaneous musician,' with vibes another rabbit in his bag of tricks. But listening to him closely is to experience a player who eschews the slow vibrators of Milt Jackson while making melodic sense on his own terms. In fact, he may deserve as much credit as Gary Burton for moving the instrument forward after Jackson had brought it into the age of bebop".

Track listing
All compositions by Victor Feldman except where noted.

 "Fidelius" – 2:48
 "Squeeze Me" (Fats Waller, Clarence Williams) – 3:20
 "Sweet and Lovely" (Gus Arnheim, Jules LeMare, Harry Tobias) – 3:44
 "Bass Reflex" – 3:59
 "Chart of My Heart" (Bob Newman) – 3:28
 "Wilbert's Tune" – 4:00
 "Evening in Paris" – 5:58

Personnel
Victor Feldman – vibraphone
Frank Rosolino – trombone (tracks 5–7) 
Harold Land – tenor saxophone (tracks 5–7)
Carl Perkins – piano
Leroy Vinnegar – bass
Stan Levey – drums

References

Victor Feldman albums
1957 albums
Albums recorded at Radio Recorders